Isaac transliterated from Yitzhak, Yitzchok was one of the three patriarchs in the Hebrew Bible, whose story is told in the book of Genesis.

' Isaac is a given name derived from Judaism and a given name among Jewish, Christian, and Muslim societies, generally in reference to the above. "Ike"  and "Ise" are also short forms of the name .

Forms of in different languages

Albanian: Isak
Arabic: إسحٰق, إسحاق  (Ishaq, ʼIsḥāq)
Armenian: Սաակ (Saak), Սահակ (Sahak), Սահակ (Sahag)
Azerbaijani: İshaq/Исһаг/ایسهاق, İsaak/Исаак/ایسااک
Basque: Isaak
Belarusian: Ісак (Isak)
Bengali: ইসহাক (Ishak)
Bosnian: Ishak
Breton: Izaag
Bulgarian: Исаак (Isaak)
Catalan: Isaac
Chinese Simplified: 艾萨克 (Aìsàkè) / 以撒 (Mandarin: Yǐsǎ; Cantonese: Ji5saat3)
Chinese Traditional: 艾薩克 (Àisàkè) / 以撒 (Mandarin: Yǐsǎ; Cantonese: Ji5saat3)
Croatian: Izak
Czech: Izák
Danish: Isak, (older:) Isach
Dutch: Isaak
English: Ike, Isac (Old English)
Esperanto: Isaako, Izaak, Isĥak, Ike, Isac
Estonian: Iisak
Ewe: Isak
Faroese: Ísakur
Finnish: Iisakki
French: Isaac
Galician: Isaac 
Georgian: ისააკ (Isaak)
German: Isaak
Greek: Ισαάκιος (Isaakios), Ισαάκ (Isaák)
Haitian Creole: Izarak
Hausa: Is'haƙu, Isaka
Hebrew: יִצְחָק, (Yiṣḥāq, IPA /jits'xak/), Yitzhak, Itzhak, Yitshak, Itshak
Hindi: इसहाक (Isahaak)
Hmong: Ixaj
Hungarian: Izsák
Icelandic: Ísak
Indonesian: Ishak
Irish: Íosác
Italian: Isacco
Japanese: アイザック (Aizakku) / イサク (Isaku)
Javanese: Iskak
Kannada: ಐಸಾಕ್ (Aisāk)
Khmer: អ៊ីសាក (Aisak)
Korean: 이삭 (I-sak), 아이작 (Aijak)
Kyrgyz: Ыскаак (Isqaaq), Исхак (İshaq)
Lao: ອີຊາກ (Isak)
Ladino: יצחק (Yiṣḥāq), Ike, Itshak, Izak, Yshac, Yshak, Ishac, Isak, Yitzhak, Yitshak (Yitsḥak), Yitzjak, Isacc
Latin: ius, us
Latvian: Aizeks, Izaks
Lithuanian: Izaokas
Macedonian: Исак (Isak)
Malay: Ishak, Sahak
Malayalam: ഇസഹാക് (Isahaak)
Māori: Ihaka
Mongolian: Исаак (Isaak)
Norwegian: Isak
Persian: اسحاق (Eshaq)
Polish: Izaak
Portuguese: Isaque,
Russian: Исаак (Isaak), Айзек(Ayzek)
Romanian: Isac, Ițac
Scottish Gaelic: Iosag
Serbian Cyrillic: Исак (Isak)
Slovene: Izak
Somali: Isxaaq
Spanish: Isaac 
Swahili: Isaka, Isaki
Swedish: Isak, Isac
Syriac: ܐܝܤܚܩ (Iskhaaq)
Tamil: ஈசாக்கு (eesaaku)
Telugu: ఇస్సాకు, (Issāku) 
Thai: อิสอัค, ไอแซก (Xịsæk)
Turkish: İshak, İshâk
Ukrainian: Ісаак (Isaak)
Uyghur: ئىسھاق (Ishaq), ئىساق (Isaq)
Uzbek: Ishoq (Is-hoq)
Urdu: اسحاق
Yiddish: יצחק (Yẕẖq) (= Yitskhok, IPA /'jitsxok/), Aizik, Isaak, Izik, Yitzhak, Isac, Itzak, Itzek, Itzig, Hiztig, Izaak, Zack, Zak
Yoruba: Ísáàkì
Zulu: Isaka

Given name

Isaac
This is a selection of better known people with the name Isaac; for a comprehensive list, see .
 Saint Isaac, several people
 Isaac Abarbanel (1437–1508), Portuguese Jewish statesman and philosopher 
 Isaac Alarcón (born 1998), Mexican American football player
 Isaac Albéniz (1860–1909), Spanish pianist and composer
 Isaac Alfasi (1013–1103), Algerian Talmudist and jurist
 Isaac II Angelos (1156–1204), Byzantine Emperor
 Isaac of Armenia (354–439), Patriarch of the Armenian Apostolic Church
 Isaac Asiata (born 1992), American football player
 Isaac Asimov (1920–1992), Russian-born American writer and biochemist
 Isaac Babel (1894–1940), Russian journalist, playwright and short story writer
 Isaac Barrow (1630–1677), English theologian and mathematician
 Isaac Beeckman (1588–1637), Dutch philosopher and scientist
 Isaac de Benserade (1613–1691), French poet
 Isaac the Blind (c.1160–1235), French Jewish mysticist and Kabbalist
 Isaac Boleslavsky (1919–1977), Soviet chess grandmaster
 Isaac Brock (1769–1812), British Army officer and colonial administrator
 Isaac Brock (born 1975), American lead singer in Modest Mouse
 Isaac Casaubon (1559–1614), French-born English classical scholar and philologist
 Isaac of the Cells, Egyptian Christian monk who lived during the 6th and 7th centuries
 Isaac da Costa (1798–1860), Dutch Jewish poet
 Isaac Cuenca (born 1991), Spanish footballer
 Isaac Dalby (1744–1824), English mathematician and surveyor
 Isaac D'Israeli (1766–1848), British writer, scholar and man of letters
 Isaac Deutscher (1907–1967), Polish writer, journalist and political activist
 Isaac Hanson (born 1980), American musician, guitarist in Hanson
 Isaac Hayes (1942–2008), American singer-songwriter, voice actor, and producer
 Isaac Israel Hayes (1832–1881), American Arctic explorer, physician and politician
 Isaac Hamilton (born 1994), American basketball player
 Isaac Heller (1926–2015), American toy manufacturer, co-founder of Remco
 Isaac Hempstead Wright (born 1999), English actor
 Isaac Herzog (born 1960), 11th President of Israel
 Isaac Isaacs (1855–1948), Australian Chief Justice and Governor-General
 Isaac Israeli ben Solomon (c. 832 – c. 932), Arab Jewish physician and philosopher
 Isaac Israëls (1865–1934), Dutch impressionist painter
 Isaac Kashdan (1905–1985), American chess grandmaster
 Isaac I Komnenos (c. 1007–1061), Byzantine Emperor
 Isaac Komnenos (son of Alexios I) (1093 – aft. 1152), Byzantine prince
 Isaac Komnenos of Cyprus (c.1155–1196), ruler of Cyprus
 Isaac Kragten (born 2002), Canadian actor
 Isaac Lea (1792-1886), American publisher, conchologist and geologist
 Isaac Levitan (1860–1900), Russian landscape painter
 Isaac Luria (1534–1572), Jewish religious leader and mysticist
 Isaac Makwala (born 1986), Botswana sprinter
 Isaac Nauta (born 1997), American football player
 Isaac Newton (1642–1727), English mathematician, astronomer, and physicist
 Isaac of Nineveh (c. 613 – c. 700), Syriac Christian bishop and theologian
 Isaac Okoro (born 2001), American basketball player 
 Isaac Okoronkwo (born 1978), Nigerian footballer
 Isaac Oliver (c.1565–1617), French-born English portrait painter
 Isaac van Ostade (1621–1649), Dutch genre and landscape painter
 Isaac Peral (1851–1895), Spanish engineer, naval officer and designer of the Peral Submarine
 Isaac Leib Peretz (1852–1915), Yiddish writer from Poland
 Isaac Pitman (1813–1897), English inventor of shorthand/stenography
 Isaac Roberts (1829–1904), Welsh amateur astronomer
 Isaac Rochell (born 1995), American football player
 Isaac Rosefelt (born 1985), American-Israeli basketball player
 Isaac Henrique Sequeira (1738–1816), Portuguese physician
 Isaac Shelby (1750–1826), Governor of Kentucky
 Isaac Singer (1811–1875), American inventor and businessman (sewing machine)
 Isaac Bashevis Singer (1902–1991), Polish-born American author, Nobel prize literature 1978
 Isaac Slade (born 1989), American lead singer in The Fray
 Isaac Stern (1920–2001), Ukrainian-born American violinist and conductor
 Isaac Taylor (1787–1865), English philosopher & historian
 Isaac Taylor (1829–1901), Anglican priest, philologist, toponymist
 Isaac Titsingh (1745–1812), Dutch surgeon, scholar, merchant-trader and ambassador
 Isaac Vorsah (born 1988), Ghanaian footballer
 Isaac Watts (1674–1748), English Christian minister, hymn writer, theologian, and logician
 Isaac Yiadom (born 1996), American football player
 Isaac Wayne (1772–1856), U.S. Congressman
 Isaac Wayne (1699–1774), Pennsylvania Provincial Assembly member, Captain of Pennsylvania Provincial Forces during the French and Indian War
Isaac White (basketball) (born 1998), Australian basketball player
Isaach
Isaach de Bankolé (born 1957), Ivorian actor

Fictional people

 Isaac, a character played by Ashley David in the British web series Corner Shop Show
 Isaac, the main antagonist from the video game Konami's Castlevania: Curse of Darkness and Nintendo's Devil's Third
 Isaac, the main protagonist in video games The Binding of Isaac and The Binding of Isaac: Rebirth
 Isaac, a main character in Nintendo's Golden Sun series
 Isaac, an android of extraterrestrial origin in American television series The Orville, played by Mark Jackson
 Isaac Chroner, the main antagonist from the Stephen King short story Children of the Corn
 Isaac Clarke, the main protagonist from the Dead Space video game series
 Isaac Davis, Woody Allen's character in Manhattan
 Isaac Dian in the light novel and anime series Baccano!
 Isaac Harris in the Stephen King novella The Bazaar of Bad Dreams
 Isaac Heller, main antagonist from season 4 of Once Upon a Time
 Isaac Henderson in The Mummy 
 Isaac Kleiner in the video games Half-Life and Half-Life 2
 Isaac Lahey, a werewolf and former member of the McCall Pack in MTV's cult television series Teen Wolf, played by Daniel Sharman
 Isaac Mendez in the television series Heroes, played by Santiago Cabrera
 Isaac Netero in the manga series Hunter × Hunter
 Isaac Washington, bartender on The Love Boat, played by Ted Lange

Isaak
 Isaak Abelin (1883–1965), Swiss physiologist
 Isaak Asknaziy (1856–1902), Russian painter
 Isaak Bacharach (1854–1942), German mathematician
 Isaak Benrubi (born 1876–1943), Ottoman philosopher 
 Isaak van den Blocke (1574–1626), Flemish painter in Poland
 Isaak Brodsky (1884–1939), Soviet painter
 Isaak Bubis (1910–2000), Moldavian Soviet engineer and architect
 Isaak August Dorner (1809–1884), German church leader
 Isaak Dunayevsky (1900–1955), Soviet composer
 Isaak Elias (born 1912–1998), Canadian politician
 Isaak Löw Hofmann, Edler von Hofmannsthal (1759–1849), Austrian merchant
 Isaak de Graaf (born 1668–1743), Dutch cartographer
 Isaak Iselin (1728–1782), Swiss philosopher of history and politics
 Isaak Markus Jost (1793–1860), German Jewish historian
 Isaak Kikoin (1908–1984), Soviet physicist 
 Isaak Markovich Khalatnikov (1919–2021), Soviet physicist
 Isaak B. Klejman (1921–2012), Ukrainian Soviet archaeologist
 Isaak Lalayants (1870–1933), Russian revolutionary
 Isaak Ah Mau (born 1982), New Zealand rugby league player
 Isaak D. Mayergoyz, American academic
 Isaak Mazepa (1884–1952), Ukrainian politician
 Isaak Moiseevich Milin (1919–1992), Soviet mathematician
 Isaak "Tjaak" Pattiwael (1914–1987), Indonesian footballer
 Isaak Pomeranchuk (1913–1966), Soviet physicist
 Isaak Illich Rubin (1886–1937), Soviet economist
 Isaak Augustijn Rumpf (1673–1723), Dutch Governor of Ceylon
 Isaak Tirion (1705–1765), Dutch publisher
 Isaak Voss (1618–1689), Dutch scholar and manuscript collector
 Isaak Yaglom (1921–1988), Soviet mathematician
 Isaak Zelensky (1890–1938), Soviet politician

Surname Isaac or Isaak
 Adèle Isaac (1854–1915), French operatic soprano
 Alexandre Isaac (1845–1899), French lawyer, Senator of Guadeloupe 1885–1889
 Arthur Isaac, English cricketer
 Auguste Isaac (1849–1938), French politician
 Bryan Isaac, dancer
 Bobby Isaac, American racing driver
 Chris Isaak, American musician
 George Isaac (politician), Egyptian politician
 Glynn Isaac, South African archaeologist
 Heinrich Isaac, Ugonis, Henricus, Heinrich, Arrigo or Ysaac, Franco-Flemish composer
 John Isaac (cricketer), English cricketer
 Luis Isaac, Puerto Rican baseball player
 Oscar Isaac, American actor
 Ray Isaac (quarterback), American football player
 Ray Isaac (singer), Australian singer
 Rhys Isaac, American historian
 Robert M. Isaac, American politician
 Ty Isaac, American football player

See also
 Isaac (disambiguation)
 Isaacs (surname)
 Isaacson
 Ike (given name)

References

Surnames
Given names
English masculine given names
Jewish surnames
Hebrew masculine given names
Hebrew-language names
Masculine given names
Modern names of Hebrew origin
Portuguese masculine given names
Spanish masculine given names